Pizzo di Campel (2,376 m) is a mountain of the Lepontine Alps, located south-east of Soazza in the canton of Graubünden. It lies on the range between the Val de la Forcola and the Val de Montogn.

References

External links
Pizzo di Campel on Hikr

Mountains of the Alps
Mountains of Graubünden
Lepontine Alps
Mountains of Switzerland
Two-thousanders of Switzerland
Soazza